The Marshall County School District is a public school district based in Marshall County, Mississippi (USA).

The district serves the towns of Byhalia and Potts Camp as well as most rural areas in Marshall County.

Schools
Byhalia High School (Grades 9-12)
Potts Camp High School (Grades 4-12)
H. W. Byers High School (Grades 7-12)
Byhalia Middle School (Grades 5-8)
Byhalia Elementary School (Grades K-4)
H. W. Byers Elementary School (Grades K-6)
Mary Reid Elementary School (Grades K-3)
Galena School (Grades K-8)

Demographics

2006-07 school year
There were a total of 3,408 students enrolled in the Marshall County School District during the 2006–2007 school year. The gender makeup of the district was 49% female and 51% male. The racial makeup of the district was 60.24% African American, 35.80% White, 3.84% Hispanic, 0.09% Asian, and 0.03% Native American. 76.5% of the district's students were eligible to receive free lunch.

Previous school years

Accountability statistics

See also
List of school districts in Mississippi

References

External links
 

Education in Marshall County, Mississippi
School districts in Mississippi